Andre Alexander-George Blackman (born 10 November 1990) is an English professional footballer who plays for Dulwich Hamlet. 

A left back, he can also play as a wing back and a left winger.

Early life
Blackman was born in Lambeth, London.

Club career

Early career
Blackman began his career at Afewee Academy in Brixton before joining as a trainee with Arsenal, moving to Tottenham Hotspur and then signing for Portsmouth at the age of 16. He also had spells with Chelsea, and West Ham.

Bristol City
Blackman started his professional career by signing a two-year contract with Bristol City after his release by Portsmouth.

Blackman made his debut for Bristol City in the League Cup match against Brentford on 11 August 2009. On 1 October 2009, he was released by Bristol City over a disciplinary matter, without making a league appearance. He then went on trial with Championship side Leicester City, which proved to be unsuccessful.

AFC Wimbledon
After declaring he wanted to "sort his life out", Blackman signed for Conference National club AFC Wimbledon on 1 June 2010, and made his debut in their 1–0 away win against Southport on 14 August; however, after a handful of appearances, Blackman was declared surplus to requirements and was replaced by Chris Bush, and subsequently Gareth Gwillim.
Blackman featured in 18 League, Cup and friendly matches scoring twice, including one against an Arsenal XI – his former club.

On 12 January 2011, Blackman went on trial with Oldham Athletic, but was not signed. On 9 February 2011, it was announced that Blackman had joined an unnamed league club on trial.

Celtic
In October 2011, Blackman had a trial with Scottish Premier League side Celtic, playing his first match in a year when Celtic's development squad played a bounce game against a Rangers XI. This trial resulted in Blackman signing for Celtic in November 2011. He made his debut for Celtic on 3 March, in a 1–1 draw with Aberdeen. Although not featured enough at Celtic, the club won their first title in over four years.

Blackman thanked Neil Lennon for saving his football career after a troubled year and admitted he had to show humility and mental strength to make a breakthrough. At the end of the season, Blackman was awarded 'Tackle of the Year' at Celtic when a video was shown of Blackman accidentally tackling the manager Lennon as he skidding toward him during a match, sending him crashing to the turf.

Blackman was loaned to Inverness CT for the first part of the 2012–13 season in order to get more first team experience. On 15 September 2012, he made his debut for the club in a 1–1 draw against Aberdeen where he made impressive debut, resulting him earning a man of the match. His loan spell was terminated by Inverness CT, however, three months early. Manager Terry Butcher revealed he terminated Blackman loan spell because of his poor attitude and discipline.

He was released by Celtic in November 2012, just one year after signing for the club.

Plymouth Argyle
Blackman signed a six-month contract with Plymouth Argyle in July 2013. He made his debut in the club's first game of the new season at Southend United, and also started in the next two matches before losing his place in the team. Blackman scored the first goal of his career in a Football League Trophy tie against Swindon Town, but he remained on the fringes of the team and made his ninth and final appearance for the club in October. He was released when his contract expired in January 2014.

Non league spells
In March 2014, Blackman joined Conference South club Dover Athletic on non-contract terms and scored on his debut against Dartford in the Kent Senior Cup.

Shortly after his move to Dover Athletic, Blackman joined Conference South side Maidenhead United.

Trial with Leeds
On 23 May 2014, Blackman was strongly linked with a move to Leeds United, after Leeds owner Massimo Cellino showed an interest in reviving his career. On 28 June 2014, he was pictured with the Leeds United first team squad at the launch of the Leeds 2014–15 shirt at Elland Road. On 30 June 2014, he travelled with Leeds on their two-week pre-season training camp to Santa Cristina in Italy, with Leeds officially announcing Blackman had joined them on trial. After a trial spell, Leeds decided not to take up the option to sign Blackman.

Blackpool
On 29 September, Blackman joined Blackpool on a one-year contract with the option of a further year. He started against the club he had a trial at in the summer, Leeds United in a 3–1 loss.

Crawley Town
On 19 July 2016, Blackman joined League Two side Crawley Town on a one-year deal after a short spell with Moroccan side MAS Fez.

Barnet
Blackman joined Barnet on 26 August 2017. He scored his first goal for Barnet on his debut in an EFL Trophy tie against former club AFC Wimbledon on 29 August 2017. He was released by Barnet at the end of the 2017–18 season.

Later career
On 11 September 2018, he made a competitive appearance for Gillingham, as a trialist in the Kent Senior Cup. Blackman went on trial with Southend United in July 2019. He joined the Shrimpers on a "monthly multiplicity contract" on 2 August. He later played for Ebbsfleet United that season, before joining Dulwich Hamlet in November 2020.

Career statistics

References

External links

1990 births
Living people
Footballers from Lambeth
English footballers
Association football defenders
Arsenal F.C. players
Tottenham Hotspur F.C. players
Portsmouth F.C. players
Bristol City F.C. players
AFC Wimbledon players
Celtic F.C. players
Inverness Caledonian Thistle F.C. players
Plymouth Argyle F.C. players
Dover Athletic F.C. players
Maidenhead United F.C. players
Blackpool F.C. players
Maghreb de Fès players
Crawley Town F.C. players
Barnet F.C. players
Southend United F.C. players
Ebbsfleet United F.C. players
Dulwich Hamlet F.C. players
English Football League players
National League (English football) players
Scottish Premier League players
Botola players
Expatriate footballers in Morocco
English expatriate sportspeople in Morocco